Balderson may refer to:

People
Thomas Balderson, cricketer
George Balderson, cricketer 
Dick Balderson, baseball executive
Margaret Balderson, Australian novelist 
Scott Balderson, Australian-born footballer
Steve Balderson, film director
Troy Balderson, American politician 
Walter Balderson, television editor and video engineer

Places
Balderson, Ontario
Balderson, West Virginia
Balderson Station, California 

Patronymic surnames
English-language surnames
Surnames of English origin
Surnames of British Isles origin